Bizarreness effect is the tendency of bizarre material to be better remembered than common material. The scientific evidence for its existence is contested. Some research suggests it does exist, some suggests it doesn't exist and some suggests it leads to worse remembering.

Causes
McDaniel and Einstein argues that bizarreness intrinsically does not enhance memory in their paper from 1986. They claim that bizarre information becomes distinctive. It is the distinctiveness that according to them makes encoding easier. Which makes common sense from an instinctual perspective as the human brain will disregard ingesting information it already is familiar with and will be particularly attuned to taking in new information as an adaptation technique.

See also
Flashbulb memory
Von Restorff effect

References

Cognitive biases